Timothy Daniel Considine (December 31, 1940 – March 3, 2022) was an American actor, writer, photographer, and automotive historian.  He was best known for his acting roles in the late 1950s and early 1960s.

Early life
Considine was born in Los Angeles on December 31, 1940.  His mother, Carmen (Pantages), was the daughter of theater magnate Alexander Pantages; his father, John W. Considine Jr., was an Oscar-nominated movie producer for Boys Town.  Considine's grandfather, John Considine, was Alexander Pantages' rival vaudeville impresario, while one of his uncles, Bob Considine, was a columnist and author.  He had two siblings: John, who was also an actor, and Erin.

Career
Considine made his film debut in 1953, co-starring with Red Skelton in The Clown, a remake of the 1931 movie The Champ.  Credited as Timmie Considine, a review by The New York Times characterized his performance as "properly wistful, serious, and manly".

Considine's best known acting roles were in the 1955–1957 Disney TV serials Spin and Marty (he played Spin) and Hardy Boys (he played older brother Frank opposite Tommy Kirk as Joe), both of which appeared in 15-minute segments on The Mickey Mouse Club.  He also appeared in the Disney show The Swamp Fox as Gabriel Marion, nephew of Francis Marion; in the Disney motion picture The Shaggy Dog; and as the eldest son, Mike Douglas, in the first years of the long-running television series My Three Sons, when it aired on ABC.  In both The Shaggy Dog and My Three Sons, he starred with Fred MacMurray.  In 1957, Considine played the role of Ted Nickerson in a television pilot made for CBS based on the popular Nancy Drew series of books by Carolyn Keene.  He co-starred with Roberta Shore and Frankie Thomas.

On December 31, 1959, his 19th birthday and before the debut of My Three Sons, Considine appeared as Jamie Frederick in the episode "Bound Boy" on CBS's Johnny Ringo western television series, starring Don Durant in the title role.  In the story line, a rancher is investigated for turning orphaned boys into virtual slaves.  The following year, Considine played the role of Franklin D. Roosevelt's eldest son James between ages 14 and 17, in the 1960 feature film Sunrise at Campobello.  In a 1966 episode of The Fugitive he acted as a helper for Dr. Kimble.  He played young rebel Billy Penn in the Bonanza episode "The Reluctant Rebel", which aired on November 21, 1965.  Considine played the role of "Scott Coleman" in the 1970 Gunsmoke television film series (S16.E6 and S16.E7), "Snow Train" parts 1 and 2. Considine later featured in the 1970 film Patton, portraying the shell-shocked soldier slapped by General George S. Patton, Jr.  The role is credited as "Soldier Who Gets Slapped".

As an adult, Considine was an automobile historian, photographer, and writer who specialized in motor sports. He was the author of The Photographic Dictionary of Soccer (1979), The Language of Sport (1982), and American Grand Prix Racing: A Century of Drivers and Cars (1997). He also filled in for the late William Safire as writer of the "On Language" column in The New York Times Magazine.

In 2000, Considine and David Stollery, his co-star in the Spin and Marty serials, made cameo appearances in The New Adventures of Spin and Marty: Suspect Behavior, a made-for-TV movie on the ABC network.  A DVD version of the Adventures of Spin & Marty was released in December 2005 as part of the fifth wave of the Walt Disney Treasures series.  On the 50th anniversary of the serial's premiere, Considine and Stollery were interviewed by Leonard Maltin as a DVD bonus feature about their experiences filming the hit series.  Considine later participated in the My Three Sons 50th-Anniversary Reunion at the Paley Center for Media in Beverly Hills, California, on June 19, 2010.  He was a panelist at the event alongside most of the surviving cast members.

Personal life
Considine married his first wife, Charlotte Stewart, in 1965.  They did not have children, and divorced in 1969.  Ten years later, he married Willett Hunt.  They remained married until his death, and had one son, Christopher.

Considine died on March 3, 2022, at his home in Mar Vista, California.  He was 81 years old.

Filmography

References

Specific

Bibliography

External links
 
 
Disney Legends profile
Tim Considine profile
Tim Considine acting career prior to Spin and Marty in 1955.

1940 births
2022 deaths
American male child actors
American male film actors
American male television actors
American people of Greek descent
American people of Irish descent
Sportswriters from California
Male actors from Los Angeles
Automotive historians
Historians from California
Considine family